The Charton Bullseye was a fanzine published from 1975-76 by the CPL Gang highlighting Charlton Comics. It was a large format publication, with color covers on card stock and black & white interiors. Charton Bullseye published several previously unpublished Charlton superhero and adventure stories, along with articles on Charlton comics, news, reviews, pinups, and more.

History
The CPL Gang was a group of comics enthusiasts who published the fanzine Contemporary Pictorial Literature (CPL) in the mid-1970s. Founded by Roger Stern and Bob Layton, the CPL Gang included Roger Slifer, Duffy Vohland, and the young John Byrne, all of whom themselves became comics professionals by the tail-end of the 1970s.

CPL rapidly became a popular fan publication, and led to the CPL Gang forming an alliance with Charlton. During the mid-1970s, both Marvel Comics and DC Comics were publishing in-house "fan" publications (F.O.O.M. and The Amazing World of DC Comics respectively), and Charlton wished to make inroads into the superhero market, as well as "establish a fan presence". The CPL Gang first got permission to publish a one-shot called Charlton Portfolio (actually CPL #9/10) in 1974 which included the unpublished sixth issue of Blue Beetle vol. 5 (1967 series).

The positive response to Charlton Portfolio led to the CPL Gang getting approval to publish a Charlton-focused fanzine, Charlton Bullseye. This in turn led to Charlton giving Layton and Stern "access to unpublished material from their vaults by the likes of Steve Ditko, Jeff Jones and a host of others". Much of this material made it into the five issues of Charlton Bullseye.

Issues
 First half of unpublished Captain Atom #90 story, finished by John Byrne.
 Second half of unpublished Captain Atom story.
 Kung Fu issue, unpublished "Wrong Country" by Sanho Kim intended for Yang.
 (Apr. 1976) — new E-Man story and first half of unpublished final Doomsday+1 story.
 (Sept. 1976) — new The Question story by Alex Toth and second half of unpublished final Doomsday+1 story.

See also 
 Charlton Spotlight

References

External links
Charlton Bullseye, CPL/GANG Publications, 1975 Series at the Grand Comics Database
 Charlton Bullseye #2

1975 establishments in Indiana
1976 disestablishments in Indiana
Bimonthly magazines published in the United States
Bullseye
Comics by John Byrne (comics)
Comics by Roger Stern
Comics by Steve Ditko
Comics magazines published in the United States
Comics zines
Defunct magazines published in the United States
Magazines about comics
Magazines established in 1975
Magazines disestablished in 1976
Magazines published in Indianapolis